Charles William Gregory (30 September 1878 – 14 November 1910) was an Australian cricketer who played for New South Wales.

In November 1906, Gregory scored 383 for New South Wales against Queensland, at the time an Australian record. It is also the highest score made by an Australian cricketer who has not played in a Test match.

Gregory was born in Sydney; he died at the age of 32 in the Sydney suburb of Darlinghurst.

Four of his relatives played Test cricket for Australia: his brother Syd won 58 caps, his cousin Jack 24, his uncle Dave three and his father Ned one. Two more uncles, Arthur and Charles, had short first-class careers.

Gregory died at the age of 32 in St Vincent's Hospital, Sydney of blood poisoning deriving from an abscess on the ear.

References

External links

1878 births
1910 deaths
Australian cricketers
New South Wales cricketers
Cricketers from Sydney
Deaths from sepsis